Metasclerosoma is a genus of harvestmen in the family Sclerosomatidae from Italy.

Species
 Metasclerosoma depressum (Canestrini, 1872)
 Metasclerosoma remyi (Dresco, 1950)
 Metasclerosoma sardum (Thorell, 1876)
 Metasclerosoma siculum Marcellino, 1977
 Metasclerosoma simile (Roewer, 1916)

References

Harvestmen
Harvestman genera